Peter P. Swire (born May 15, 1958) is the Elizabeth and Tommy Holder Chair and Professor of Law and Ethics in the Scheller College of Business at the Georgia Institute of Technology. He is an internationally recognized expert in privacy law. Swire is also a senior fellow at the Future of Privacy Forum and a member of the National Academies of Science and Engineering Forum on Cyber Resilience. During the Clinton Administration, he became the first person to hold the position of Chief Counselor for Privacy in the Office of Management and Budget. In this role, he coordinated administration policy on privacy and data protection, including interfacing with privacy officials in foreign countries. He may be best known for shaping the Health Insurance Portability and Accountability Act Privacy Rule while serving as the Chief Counselor for Privacy. In November, 2012 he was named as co-chair of the Tracking Protection Working Group of the World Wide Web Consortium (W3C), to attempt to mediate a global Do Not Track standard. In August 2013, President Obama named Swire as one of five members of the Director of National Intelligence Review Group on Intelligence and Communications Technologies.

Education
Swire graduated summa cum laude with an A.B. degree from the Woodrow Wilson School of Public and International Affairs at Princeton with a concentration in economics in 1980. Swire also earned a membership in the Phi Beta Kappa society. After earning his undergraduate degree, Swire studied at the Université Libre de Bruxelles on a Rotary International Ambassadorial Scholarship. In 1985, Swire graduated from Yale Law School where he was the senior editor of the Yale Law Journal. Upon graduation, Swire clerked for the Honorable Ralph K. Winter, Jr. at the United States Court of Appeals for the Second Circuit from 1985 to 1986.

Career
Swire started his professional career as an associate for Powell, Goldstein, Frazer & Murphy in Washington, D.C. In 1990, he began his academic career as an associate professor at the University of Virginia School of Law. Swire began teaching at Ohio State University in 1996, but left the university in April 1999 to become the first Chief Counselor for Privacy in the Office of Budget and Management during the Clinton Administration.

As the chief counselor for privacy in the Clinton administration, Swire became known as a behind-the-scenes go-to guy. Swire shepherded the creation of the HIPAA Privacy Rule by working with the Department of Health and Human Services to create a proposed privacy rule. The proposed privacy rule was opened up for public comment and generated over 52,000 comments. The final text of the rule was announced by President Bill Clinton and the Secretary of Health and Human Services, Donna Shalala on December 20, 2000.  During his time in the Clinton Administration, Swire also chaired a 15-agency White House Working Group on updating wiretap law for the Internet age.

In early 2001, Swire resumed his position at Ohio State, and became director in 2002 of the Washington D.C. Summer Program for the Moritz College of Law. In 2005, Swire was named the C. William O'Neil Professor in Law and Judicial Administration at the Moritz College of Law of Ohio State University. Swire has researched many elements of technology law, including privacy, data brokering, electronic surveillance, and computer security. He is a founding faculty editor of I/S: A Journal of Law and Policy for the Information Society and with Jonathan Zittrain is the editor of Cyberspace Law Abstracts of the Social Science Research Network.

During the Obama-Biden Transition, Swire worked on teams for the Federal Trade Commission and Federal Communications Commission, and served as counsel to the New Media Team. In 2009 and 2010, Swire took leave from law teaching to enter the Obama Administration, in the National Economic Council.  He was special assistant to President Obama for economic policy, working primarily on housing and technology issues.

In November 2012, Swire was named as co-chair of the Tracking Protection Working Group of the World Wide Web Consortium (W3C), to attempt to mediate a global Do Not Track standard. He resigned in August 2013.

In the wake of Edward Snowden's unlawful leaks of documents about international espionage in 2013, Swire was appointed to the Director of National Intelligence Review Group on Intelligence and Communications Technologies by President Obama. The report was subsequently republished by the Princeton University Press.

In Fall 2013, Swire accepted the Nancy J. and Lawrence P. Huang Professor in the Scheller College of Business at the Georgia Institute of Technology.  Swire's responsibilities include teaching, research, and service as a part of the Law and Ethics program. In March, 2015, Swire received the International Association of Privacy Professionals Privacy Leadership Award.

In January 2015, law firm Alston & Bird hired Swire as senior counsel in its privacy & data security practice.

In Fall 2017, Swire accepted the Elizabeth & Tommy Holder Chair in the Scheller College of Business at the Georgia Institute of Technology.

In April 2018, Swire was named a 2018 Andrew Carnegie Fellow by the Carnegie Corporation of New York.

See also
 NSA warrantless surveillance controversy
 Electronic evidence
 Security through obscurity
 I/S: A Journal of Law and Policy for the Information Society
 Patriot Debates
 USA PATRIOT Act, Title II

References

External links
 Peter Swire's Homepage
 Peter Swire's Future of Privacy Forum Page
 W3C Tracking Protection Working Group Page
 Peter Swire's page at Alston & Bird
 

Living people
1958 births
Princeton School of Public and International Affairs alumni
Yale Law School alumni
Ohio State University faculty
Moritz College of Law faculty
Scholars of privacy law
Clinton administration personnel
Center for American Progress people